William Harold Armstrong (born June 25, 1966) is a Canadian former professional ice hockey player.

Early life
Armstrong was born in London, Ontario. As a youth, he played in the 1979 Quebec International Pee-Wee Hockey Tournament with a minor ice hockey team from London, Ontario. Armstrong played at Western Michigan University from 1986 to 1989.

Career 
Armstrong played in one National Hockey League (NHL) game for the Philadelphia Flyers during the 1990–91 NHL season and spent the rest of his professional career in the American Hockey League (AHL) and International Hockey League (IHL). His playing career was cut short due to a brain tumor which required surgery. 

He invented the Michigan goal, a lacrosse-style shot notably used by Mike Legg (after whose alma mater the shot is named), Sidney Crosby, Miks Indrašis, Mikael Granlund, Andrei Svechnikov and Trevor Zegras.

Career statistics

See also
List of players who played only one game in the NHL

References

External links
 

1966 births
Albany River Rats players
Canadian ice hockey left wingers
Cincinnati Cyclones (IHL) players
Detroit Vipers players
Grand Rapids Griffins (IHL) players
Hershey Bears players
Sportspeople from London, Ontario
Indianapolis Ice players
Living people
Kansas City Blades players
Orlando Solar Bears (IHL) players
Philadelphia Flyers players
Undrafted National Hockey League players
Utica Devils players
Western Michigan Broncos men's ice hockey players
Ice hockey people from Ontario